Bearskin Lake is an oligotrophic glacial lake near the Boundary Waters Canoe Area (BWCA) in  Minnesota, United States. The name Bearskin Lake is an English translation of the Ojibwe-language name Muko-waiani. Bearskin Lake is a source of control sediment for US federal sediment toxicity studies. Bearskin Lake is home to Camp Menogyn, a YMCA camp only accessible by boat.

Sediments and scientific significance
Due to the cleanliness of the lake and the physical attributes of its sediment, Bearskin Lake sediment is ideal for sediment toxicity testing. Bearskin Lake sediment is used as a control sediment in the federal government's toxicity tests and was used to develop the US EPA's toxicity testing methods.

See also 
 List of lakes in Minnesota

Further reading 
US EPA. 2000. Methods for Measuring the Toxicity and Bioaccumulation of Sediment-associated Contaminants with Freshwater Invertebrates Second Edition.
Kemble, N.E., C.G. Ingersoll, and J.L. Kunz. 2001. Evaluation of Toxicity of Sediment Samples Collected from Santa Ana National Wildlife Refuge, Texas. United  States Geological Survey.
Bechtel Jacobs Company LLC. 1998. Biota Sediment Accumulation Factors for Invertebrates: Review and Recommendations for the Oak Ridge Reservation U.S. Department of Energy.
Mierzykowski, S.E., C.G. Ingersoll, and K.C. Carr. 1997 U.S. Fish and Wildlife Service New England Field Office Special Project Report: FY97-MEFO-1-EC Toxicity Tests and Sediment Chemistry at Site 9 (Neptune Drive Disposal Site).
National Oceanic and Atmospheric Administration. 1996. Bioavailability of Sediment-Associated Toxic Organic Contaminants.

References

External links
MN DNR Lake Finder Data
Lake Assessment Program 1995: West Bearskin Lake

Lakes of Minnesota
Lakes of Cook County, Minnesota